Who Killed Sara? is a Mexican mystery thriller streaming television series created by José Ignacio Valenzuela and produced by Perro Azul, which was released for Netflix on 24 March 2021. The series stars Manolo Cardona as Álex Guzmán, a man convicted for the murder of his sister, a crime that he did not commit. Season 2 premiered on 19 May 2021, two months after the release of the first one. At the end of the Season 2 finale credits, it is revealed that Season 3 is upcoming.<ref>{{Cite web|last=Lee|first=Anna G.| date=2021-05-24|url=https://www.esquire.com/entertainment/tv/a36491912/who-killed-sara-season-3//|website=Esquire|title='Season Three May Finally Reveal the Shows Real Monster'|access-date=2021-06-02}}</ref>  Season 3 (the final season) premiered on May 18, 2022 on Netflix.

 Premise 
The series follows Álex Guzmán, who, after spending 18 years in prison for a crime he did not commit, is hellbent on finding out who killed his sister Sara and getting revenge on the Lazcano family who wronged him.

 Cast 
 Manolo Cardona as Álex Guzmán, a former convict who decides to avenge the death of his sister Sara, after spending 18 years in prison for a crime he did not commit. As the series progresses, he begins a relationship with Elisa Lazcano.
Leo Deluglio as young Álex Guzmán.
 Alejandro Nones as Rodolfo Lazcano, César and Mariana's eldest, and Alex former best friend, who dated Sara prior to her death.
  as young Rodolfo Lazcano.
 Ximena Lamadrid as Sara Guzmán, the late younger sister of Álex, whose death is what led to the events of the series. She was in a relationship with Rodolfo Lazcano.
 Carolina Miranda as Elisa Lazcano, César and Mariana's youngest child and only daughter, who decides to help Alex find Sara's true killer, even if she has to expose her family's crimes. As the series progresses, she begins a relationship with Alex.
 Eugenio Siller as José María "Chema" Lazcano, César and Mariana's middle child, and a close friend of Álex, who has an estranged relationship with his family after coming out as gay. He is in a relationship with Lorenzo and the two want to be parents.
 Polo Morín as young José María Lazcano. 
 Fátima Molina as Clara, Chema's close friend, who agrees to help him and Lorenzo have a child by impregnating herself.
 Ginés García Millán as César Lazcano, a multibillionaire businessman who is the patriarch of the Lazcano family.
 Claudia Ramírez as Mariana Lazcano, the wife of César Lazcano and mother of Rodolfo, José María, and Elisa.
 Juan Carlos Remolina as Sergio Hernández, César best friend and business partner.
 Héctor Jiménez as Elroy, Mariana's adopted son and loyal adviser.
 Marco Zapata as young Elroy.
 Litzy as Marifer, Sara's best friend and Alex's former lover.
 Ela Velden as young Marifer.
 Jean Reno as Reinaldo Gómez de la Cortina
 Luis Roberto Guzmán as Lorenzo Rossi, a lawyer who is Chema's boyfriend and wants to raise a child with him.
 Ana Lucía Domínguez as Sofía, Rodolfo's estranged wife.
 Iñaki Godoy as Bruno, Sofia's teenage son and Rodolfo's stepson.

Episodes
Season overview

Season 1 (2021) 

Season 2 (2021)

Season 3 (2022)

 Production Who Killed Sara? was produced by Perro Azul for Netflix. The studio Perro Azul has their headquarters in Mexico City and is part of Netflix's Latin America offices.

Created by José Ignacio Valenzuela, the episodes of the first and second season were directed by David Ruiz and Bernardo de la Rosa. José Ignacio Valenzuela, Alexis Fridman, and Juan Uruchurtu (from Perro Azul) were also in charge of the production.

According to Eugenio Siller, the production gave the actors the liberty to add to the personalities of their characters.

The first and second season were filmed consecutively under strict safety guidelines due to the COVID-19 pandemic. Each city in Mexico has their own safety guidelines and the production moved around from city to city that allowed them to film, such as Mexico City, Guadalajara, and Puebla. Shooting locations also include Acapulco and Valle de Bravo (Lake Avándaro).

 Release 
The 10-episode first season premiered on Netflix on 24 March 2021. The second season premiered on 19 May 2021. It features the incorporation of Matías Novoa, Daniel Giménez Cacho, and Antonio de la Vega into the ensemble cast. The third and final season released on May 18, 2022.

Reception
Viewership
Upon its release, Who Killed Sara? claimed the number one spot for the most-streamed show for several weeks in the United States. On 21 April 2021, Netflix reported that the series has been seen by 55 million households during its first 28 days and went to become the most popular foreign show.

Until March 2023, the show ranked #10 in the Netflix all-time hours watched list for Non-English TV with 266.43 million hours watched globally in the first 28 days.

Critical response
The series receive positive reviews from critics. On Rotten Tomatoes, the first season has an approval rating of 86% based on 7 reviews.

Joel Keller of Decider'', praised the series and recommends people stream it. He commented "has a few logic problems, but its overall vibe is energetic enough, with good performances, to keep viewers' attention". Daniel Hart from Ready Steady Cut, considered the show "a compelling, revenge-thirsty murder mystery". Mikel Zorrilla from Espinof commented considered the series "an entertaining thriller with the soul of a telenovela that mixes mystery, drama and eroticism." Ángel S. Harguindey wrote in an article that "subscription television has allowed Mexican soap operas to thrive in their expanded themes and this series is luxurious and liberal."

Accolades 

|-
| align = "center" | 2022 || 30th Actors and Actresses Union Awards || Best Actor in an International Production || Ginés García Millán ||  || 
|}

References 

Thriller television series
2020s mystery television series
Television shows filmed in Mexico
2020s Mexican drama television series
2021 Mexican television series debuts
Spanish-language Netflix original programming
Television series about revenge